Ali Ahmed Mohab Elfil is an Egyptian footballer who plays for the Egyptian Premier League side Future FC as a defender.

Biography 
Ali Elfil was born on December 13 1992 in Egypt. He started his football career at Telephonat Beni Suef SC. In 2015,  he was transferred to Haras El Hodoud SC. In 2018, he was bought by Tala'ea El Gaish SC and in 2022 he was transferred to Future FC.In totality, he has over one hundred appearances and three goals.

Trophies 
He was a runner up for the 2019/2020 EFA League Cup and the 2020/2021 Super Cup winner.

References 

Living people
1992 births
Future FC (Egypt) players
Egyptian Premier League players